The Montreal Maroons (officially the Montreal Professional Hockey Club) were a professional ice hockey team in the National Hockey League (NHL). They played in the NHL from 1924 to 1938, winning the Stanley Cup in 1926 and 1935. They were the last non-Original Six team to win the Stanley Cup until the expansion Philadelphia Flyers won in 1974.

Founded as a team for the English community in Montreal, they shared their home city with the Canadiens, who eventually came under the same ownership as the Maroons but were intended to appeal to the French Canadian population. This was the first time since 1918, when the Montreal Wanderers folded, that Montreal would have a second hockey team. In order to accommodate the Maroons, a new arena was built for them in 1924, the Montreal Forum. The Maroons were a highly competitive team, winning the Stanley Cup twice and finishing first in their division twice more. Some of the best players of the era played for the Maroons; eleven players would be elected to the Hockey Hall of Fame, while five of the six head coaches of the Maroons were also honoured.

Financial difficulties resulting from the Great Depression led to the Maroons suspending play after 1938. Despite efforts to revive the team, the franchise was cancelled in 1947, leaving the Canadiens as the sole team in Montreal. Since the Maroons' demise, no NHL team that has won a Stanley Cup at any point in its history has subsequently folded or relocated.

History

Formation

The Montreal Maroons hockey team was created to appeal to the anglophone neighbourhoods of Montreal. On January 2, 1918, the Montreal Arena, shared by the Montreal Canadiens and the Montreal Wanderers, burned down. The Canadiens, who drew primarily Montreal's francophones, moved to the Jubilee Arena which, in 1919, also burned down, before settling in the Mount Royal Arena, which had natural ice and seating for 3,250. The Wanderers, team of Montreal's anglophone community, folded. By 1922, work began to build a team to appeal to the anglophones and return to the NHL. In July 1924, construction began on a new arena, on the site of a former roller-skating rink known as the Forum. By fall, at a cost of $1.5 million, the Montreal Forum was complete. The Montreal Forum was the first large arena in the NHL. The Maroons joined the NHL in 1924, along with the Boston Bruins. The Canadiens initially objected to a second team in Montreal, but relented when compensated by the expansion fee. The expansion fee for each team was $15,000. $11,000 of the Maroons' fee went to their local rivals, the Canadiens. While the Canadiens owner initially lodged a formal objection to ensure he would get adequate compensation for sharing his franchise's territory, he was actually quite enthusiastic about having a second franchise in the same city; rather, he would later state, he "saw in them an important and lucrative local rivalry."

At the time of their founding, the Maroons had no nickname. The Maroons' president James Strachan had been the owner of the Wanderers in the 1900s. He attempted to secure the Wanderers name, but negotiations failed, so the club was known by its official name, the Montreal Professional Hockey Club. With the team introducing maroon-coloured sweaters complete with a large capital letter "M" for a logo (the letter officially stood for their home city, not the colour) the "Maroons" nickname was picked up by the media. The club never officially changed the organizational name to incorporate the Maroons name. The Vancouver Millionaires of the Pacific Coast Hockey Association had changed their name to the Vancouver Maroons, but that club had folded before Montreal began.

Success at the gate and on the ice

In the Maroons' first season of operation they finished second to last in the league. However, the new Forum was selling out and, with the addition of players Nels Stewart, Babe Siebert and Bill Phillips, success came quickly. In a single year, the Maroons went from having their worst record in franchise history to their best. In only their second season of operation, Montreal won their first Stanley Cup. The NHL playoffs that year were a two-game total-goals format. Montreal won the opening series over the Pittsburgh Pirates 6–4, then upset the favored Ottawa Senators 2–1. In the NHL playoff final, Montreal defeated Ottawa to advance to the Stanley Cup final, against the Victoria Cougars of the Western Hockey League. In the last Stanley Cup final involving two different leagues, Montreal defeated Victoria three games to one. Contributing to the victory was rookie, and future Hall of Fame member, Nels Stewart, who scored six of the Maroons' ten goals in the series. Stewart won the Hart Trophy for most valuable player. While not a smooth skater, Stewart compensated with size (at six foot one and 195 pounds, he was a giant compared to other players of that era), toughness (amassing 119 penalty minutes), and shooting (scoring 34 of Montreal's 91 goals during the season). Stewart's 34 goals remained an NHL record for rookies until the 1970–71 season. During this era, a team's best players often played the entire game with substitutions only made for injuries.

For the 1926–27 season, the NHL expanded to ten teams and was divided into American and Canadian divisions. The Maroons finished third in the Canadian division, behind their rivals the Canadiens, with whom they now shared the Forum. The two teams met in the playoffs for a two-game total-goals series. The Forum was packed with 11,000 fans, in a building whose capacity was listed at 10,000, to watch the Canadiens defeat the defending Stanley Cup champions. The Maroons also participated in another moment of hockey history when, on November 26, 1926, they were the competition in the New York Rangers' NHL debut game.

The Maroons got revenge on the Canadiens in the 1927–28 season, by eliminating them in the semi-finals of the playoffs. The Maroons then met the New York Rangers for the Stanley Cup, but lost the series three games to two. Because the circus occupied Madison Square Garden, all five games were played at the Forum.

The 1928–29 season was an oddly bad season for the Maroons, as they finished last in the Canadian division. However, they rebounded in the 1929–30 season, by finishing first. During these years, the Maroons were led by one of the most feared forward lines in the early NHL years, the "S Line", consisting of Hooley Smith, Babe Siebert and Nels Stewart, which was also one of the most penalized.

In the 1929–30 season, Dunc Munro was signed as player-coach of the team. It was during this season, that Clint Benedict of the Maroons became the first goaltender in NHL history to wear a mask, when he donned one to protect a broken nose. Although the Maroons finished first in the Canadian Division, they were eliminated in the first round of the playoffs by the Boston Bruins.

For the 1930–31 season, Stewart again led his team in goals and points, but the Maroons only finished third in the Canadian division, and were eliminated easily in the first round of the playoffs by the New York Rangers.

The Maroons made it into the playoffs of the 1931–32 season, by finishing five points ahead of the New York Americans. Montreal defeated Detroit in the opening round, but lost the semi-final match against the Toronto Maple Leafs.

The Maroons finished the 1932–33 season in second place in the Canadian division and even had three of the top six players in league points. However, Montreal was eliminated in the first round of the playoffs by Detroit.

In the playoffs of the 1933–34 season, the Chicago Black Hawks eliminated both Montreal teams, first defeating the Canadiens, then upsetting the Maroons in the semi-finals.

In 1935, Leo Dandurand, owner of the Montreal Canadiens, sold that team to Canadian Arena Company, (Ernest Savard, Louis Gelinas and Maurice Forget), which also owned the Montreal Maroons, for $165,000.

Great Depression and cessation of operations

In Montreal, financial strains from the Great Depression hurt the attendances of both the Canadiens and Maroons. However, there were far more francophone supporters for the Canadiens than anglophone supporters for the Maroons. As a result, the Maroons finished with the worst attendance in the league, three seasons in a row. Also, by 1935, both teams were owned by Canadian Arena Company. (Ernest Savard and Maurice Forget, who owned the Canadiens, were part of the Canadian Arena Company, as were Maroons owners James Strachan and Donat Raymond). It became obvious that only one team could represent Montreal. The Maroons' dire financial straits caused them to sell off several players, including star winger Hooley Smith. Despite the Maroons' financial troubles, they continued to play competitive hockey well into the 1930s.

For the 1934–35 season, the Maroons hired Tommy Gorman as coach, who had coached the Chicago Black Hawks to the Championship the previous year. The Maroons finished the season in second place behind Ottawa. In the playoffs, the Montreal Maroons defeated Chicago with defensive hockey, defeated the New York Rangers at wide-open (offensive) hockey, and then defeated the Toronto Maple Leafs, who Gorman considered one of the best hockey teams of all time, in three straight games. The Maroons won their second Stanley Cup; Gorman remains the only coach in history to win back-to-back Cups with two different teams. The Maroons team were the last team to win the Cup without a loss in the playoffs for 17 years. Gorman called this Maroon team "the greatest team that ever stepped on the ice."

The playoffs of the 1935–36 season are famous for the longest NHL playoff game of all time. On March 24–25, the Maroons lost 1–0 to the Detroit Red Wings in 176:30 of play (16:30 of the sixth overtime period). The game was especially significant for Detroit goaltender Normie Smith, who began his career with the Maroons. He shut out the Maroons again in the second game, and allowed Detroit to complete a three-game sweep by allowing only one goal. Detroit proceeded to win the first Stanley Cup in their history.

In December 1936, Maroons captain Hooley Smith was traded to the Boston Bruins, a move which would mark the beginning of the end for the franchise. The 1936–37 season saw Nels Stewart break Howie Morenz's record for career goals with 271. Stewart would hold the all-time career record for goals until it was broken by Maurice Richard in 1952.

By the start of the 1937–38 season, rumours were rampant that the Maroon franchise would be moved to another city. In September 1937, Maroons president Donat Raymond said the team would be staying in Montreal. The team's bleak financial situation finally caught up with them as they finished 12–30–6, the club's worst season since winning only nine games in 1924–25. Lionel Conacher retired prior to the season to enter politics, winning a seat in the 1937 Ontario general election as a member of the Liberal Party.  Tommy Gorman had tried to convince Conacher to stay with the Maroons and take over as coach; his retirement led Gorman to hire King Clancy. Clancy did not help improve the team's record, and on December 29 he was fired after 18 games and Gorman was re-instated as coach. Their last game for the Maroons franchise, was a 6-3 loss on March 17 against the Canadiens. They finished the season with a record of 12 wins, 30 losses and 6 ties for 30 points in 48 games, placing the team last in the Canadian Division and last overall in the league.

At the annual league meeting on June 22, the Maroons formally asked the league to suspend the franchise for a year; this was refused, and the league asked the Maroons to confirm by August 1 if they were to participate in the upcoming season or not.

The league allowed the Maroons to suspend operations for the 1938–39 season. Although it was not formally considered to be a merger unlike the much later fusion of the Minnesota North Stars and Cleveland Barons organizations, from a hockey operations perspective the transaction had the outward appearance of being a merger of the two Montreal teams since there was no dispersal draft and the Montreal owners were allowed to keep the NHL rights to the Maroons roster. However, the owners had long regarded the Maroons as Montreal's second team and had already transferred many of its best players, such as future Hall of Famer Toe Blake, to the Canadiens. As a result, only a small number of Maroons took to the ice for the 1938–39 season in a Canadiens uniform. Most of the Maroons players were either sold to the remaining NHL teams for cash or washed out of the league altogether.

Attempted revival

The Maroons' owners tried to sell their dormant franchise to interests in St. Louis, Missouri, but doubts regarding the previous failure of the St. Louis Eagles led to the league refusing permission. At the 1945 annual league meeting, held on September 7, it was noted that the backers of the Maroons franchise were in discussion to sell to a group from Philadelphia fronted by Canadiens board member Len Peto. The league governors were prepared to approve the transfer, provided the Philadelphia group could prove they had the necessary funds for a hockey team. They also made sure to clarify that the Maroons franchise rights would expire in April 1947 unless something was done with them.

Peto was able to get the necessary funding, and persuaded the league to transfer the Maroons to Philadelphia. However, despite being larger than all but two NHL cities, Philadelphia did not have an arena that could accommodate an NHL team. The city's largest arena, the Palestra at the University of Pennsylvania, did not have an ice plant, and both Penn and Madison Square Garden (which managed the Palestra) balked at the expense of installing one. The only arena in the city with an ice plant, Philadelphia Arena, was ruled out because its sight lines and capacity (5,500) were deemed inadequate even for temporary use. The league gave Peto until the end of the 1946–47 season to find a suitable arena. In February, 1946 Peto announced plans to build a 20,000-seat arena on the site of the old Baker Bowl at a cost of $2.5 million. However, when his group was unable to get funding for the project by the league-imposed deadline, the NHL cancelled the Maroons franchise.

The last active Maroons player was Herb Cain, who remained in the NHL until 1946.

Season-by-season record
Note: GP = Games played, W = Wins, L = Losses, T = Ties, Pts = Points, GF = Goals for, GA = Goals against, PIM = Penalties in minutes

Team captains
 Punch Broadbent 1924–25
 Dunc Munro 1925–28
 Nels Stewart 1928–32
 Hooley Smith 1932–36
 Lionel Conacher 1936–37
 Stewart Evans 1937–38

Hockey Hall of Fame

Players

Builders

Awards

Arenas
 Montreal Forum — built specifically for the Maroons; the Forum would become the most famous arena in hockey largely because of the Canadiens, who shared the arena with the Maroons from 1926 to 1938.

See also 

 List of Montreal Maroons players
 List of Montreal Maroons head coaches
 List of Stanley Cup champions
 Montreal Wanderers
 Montreal Canadiens
 List of defunct NHL teams
 List of NHL seasons

References
Notes

Sources

Further reading

 
 
 
 
 
 
 
 
 
 
 

 
Defunct National Hockey League teams
Mar
National Hockey League in Quebec
National Hockey League teams based in Canada
Quebec Anglophone culture in Montreal
Ice hockey clubs established in 1924
Sports clubs disestablished in 1947
1924 establishments in Quebec
1947 disestablishments in Quebec